is a motorway in Germany. Construction of the autobahn started in the 1930s, but was halted by the outbreak of World War II. Due to the division of Germany, a part of the autobahn lay in ruins until after German reunification.

Exit list 

 

 

 

 

 

 

 

 

  
'' Road continues as the B 2 into Leipzig
|}

External links 

 Construction Project Plan (German)

72
A072
A072